The 1980 Little League World Series took place between August 26 and August 30 in Williamsport, Pennsylvania. The Longkuang Little League of Hualien, Taiwan, defeated the Belmont Heights Little League of Tampa, Florida, in the championship game of the 34th Little League World Series.

Teams

Championship Bracket

Position Bracket

Notable players
Gary Sheffield (Tampa, Florida) – MLB outfielder and third baseman from 1988 to 2009
Derek Bell (Tampa, Florida) – MLB outfielder from 1991 to 2001
Ty Griffin (Tampa, Florida) - 1988 Olympic Gold Medalist (Team USA - Baseball)
Maurice Crum Sr. (Tampa, Florida) - 2 Time NCAA Football Champion (Miami Hurricanes)

External links

Little League World Series
Little League World Series
Little League World Series